Kabarett (from French cabaret = tavern) is satirical revue, a form of cabaret which developed in France by Rodolphe Salis in 1881 as the cabaret artistique. It was named Le Chat Noir and was centered on political events and satire. It later inspired creation of Kabarett venues in Germany from 1901, with the creation of Berlin's Überbrettl venue and in Austria with the creation of the Jung-Wiener Theater zum lieben Augustin housed in the Theater an der Wien. By the Weimar era in the mid-1920s it was characterized by political satire and gallows humor. It shared the characteristic atmosphere of intimacy with the French cabaret from which it was imported, but the gallows humor was a distinct German aspect.

Difference from other forms
Kabarett is the German word for the French word cabaret  but has two different meanings. The first meaning is the same as in English, describing a form of entertainment featuring comedy, song, dance, and theatre (often the word "cabaret" is used in German for this as well to distinguish this form). The latter describes a kind of political satire. Unlike comedians who make fun of all kind of things, Kabarett artists pride themselves as dedicated almost completely to political and social topics of more serious nature which they criticize using techniques like cynicism, sarcasm and irony.

History
 The first Kabarett venue was the Le Chat Noir in France, founded in 1880 by Rodolphe Salis. It later inspired similar venues in Germany and Austria such as the "Überbrettl", the first Kabarett venue (Berlin, 1901) in Germany and the "Jung-Wiener Theater zum lieben Augustin" in Vienna.

Ernst von Wolzogen founded in Berlin the first German cabaret called Überbrettl (literally Superstage, a play of words on Friedrich Nietzsche's Übermensch, Superman), later known as Buntes Theater (colourful theatre), in January 1901. In the foundation of the Überbrettl , von Wolzogen was inspired by Otto Julius Bierbaum's 1897 novel Stilpe.

In Munich, the Die Elf Scharfrichter was co-founded by Otto Falckenberg and others, in April 1901. It is sometimes considered the first political kabarett.

All forms of public criticism were banned by a censor on theatres in the German Empire, however. This was lifted at the end of the First World War, allowing the kabarett artists to deal with social themes and political developments of the time. This meant that German kabarett really began to blossom in the 1920s and 1930s, bringing forth all kinds of new cabaret artists, such as Werner Finck at the Katakombe, Karl Valentin (died 1948) at the Wien-München, Fritz Grünbaum and Karl Farkas at the Kabarett Simpl in Vienna, and Claire Waldoff. Some of their texts were written by great literary figures such as Kurt Tucholsky, Erich Kästner, and Klaus Mann.

When the Nazi party came to power in 1933, they started to repress this intellectual criticism of the times. Kabarett in Germany was hit badly. (Kander and Ebb's Broadway musical, Cabaret, based on the Christopher Isherwood novel, Goodbye to Berlin, deals with this period.) In 1935 Werner Finck was briefly imprisoned and sent to a concentration camp; at the end of that year Kurt Tucholsky committed suicide; and nearly all German-speaking kabarett artists fled into exile in Switzerland, France, Scandinavia, or the United States.

When the war ended, the occupying powers ensured that the kabarett portrayed the horrors of the Nazi regime. Soon, various kabarett shows were also dealing with the government, the Cold War and the Wirtschaftswunder: Cabaret Ulenspiegel in Berlin, the university cabaret Tol(l)leranten in Mainz, the Kom(m)ödchen in Düsseldorf and the Münchner Lach- und Schießgesellschaft in Munich. These were followed in the 1950s by television cabaret.

In the GDR, the first state kabarett stage was opened in 1953, Berlin's Die Distel. It was censored and had to be very careful in criticizing the state (1954: Die Pfeffermühle in Leipzig).

In the 1960s, West German kabarett was centred on Düsseldorf, Munich, and Berlin. At the end of the decade, the students' movement of May 1968 split opinion on the genre as some old kabarett artists were booed off the stage for being part of the old establishment. In the 1970s, new forms of kabarett developed, such as the television show Notizen aus der Provinz. At the end of the 1980s, kabarett was an important part of social criticism, with a minor boom at the time of German reunification. In eastern Germany, kabarett artists had been growing more and more daring in their criticism of politicians in the time leading up to 1989. After reunification, new social problems, such as mass unemployment, the privatization of companies, and rapid changes in society, meant that cabarets rose in number. Dresden, for example, gained two new cabarets alongside the popular Herkuleskeule.

In the 1990s and at the start of the new millennium, the television and film comedy boom and a lessening of public interest in politics meant that television kabarett audiences in Germany dropped. In order to increase interest again the Walk of Fame of Cabaret in Mainz is honoring selected cabaret celebrities; many past cabaret celebrities are honored by stars and each year a star for a living one is added.

As of 1999, contemporary active political kabarettists and satirists in Germany include: Urban Priol, Thomas Reis, Arnulf Rating, Heinrich Pachl, 3 Gestirn Köln 1, Bruno Jonas, Richard Rogler, Mathias Richling, Dieter Hildebrandt (died 2013), Henning Venske, Matthias Beltz (died 2002), Matthias Deutschmann and Volker Pispers.

Other notable Kabarett artists

Willy Astor
Jürgen Becker
Konrad Beikircher
Martin Betz
Gerhard Bronner
Karl Dall
Alfred Dorfer
Gerd Dudenhöffer
Max Ehrlich, died 1944
Karl Farkas
Ottfried Fischer
Lisa Fitz
Egon Friedell, died 1938
Andreas Giebel
Rainald Grebe
Christoph Grissemann
Fritz Grünbaum, died 1941
Günter Grünwald
Josef Hader
Dieter Hallervorden
Peter Hammerschlag, died 1942
Eckart von Hirschhausen
Franz Hohler
Jörg Hube, died 2009
Hanns Dieter Hüsch, died 2005
Georg Kreisler, died 2011
Reiner Kröhnert
Maren Kroymann
Frank Lüdecke
Uwe Lyko
Rolf Miller
Wolfgang Neuss, died 1989
Maria Ney
Michael Niavarani
Dieter Nuhr
Günther Paal
Rainer Pause
Erwin Pelzig
Sissi Perlinger
Gerhard Polt
Andreas Rebers
Lukas Resetarits
Hagen Rether
Mathias Richling
Helmut Schleich
Wilfried Schmickler
Werner Schneyder
Georg Schramm
Horst Schroth
Serdar Somuncu
Emil Steinberger
Dirk Stermann
Ludger Stratmann
Mathias Tretter
Max Uthoff
Claus von Wagner
Bodo Wartke
Sigi Zimmerschied

Notable Kabarett shows and venues
Cabaret Ulenspiegel (Berlin)
Herkuleskeule (Dresden)
Kom(m)ödchen (Düsseldorf)
Mitternachtsspitzen (Cologne)
Münchner Lach- und Schießgesellschaft (Munich)
Neues aus der Anstalt
Notizen aus der Provinz
Pantheon-Theater (Bonn)
Scheibenwischer
 (Vienna)
Tol(l)leranten (Mainz)

See also
Walk of Fame of Cabaret

References

Further reading
 Ambesser, Gwendolyn von: Schaubudenzauber - Geschichte und Geschichten eines legendären Kabaretts, Verlag Edition AV, Lich/Hessen 2006, 
 Arnbom, Marie-Theres, Wacks, Georg: Jüdisches Kabarett in Wien. 1889 - 2009, Armin Berg Verlag, Wien 2009, 
 Budzinski, Klaus: Pfeffer ins Getriebe – So ist und wurde das Kabarett, Universitas Vlg., München 1982, 
 Budzinski, Klaus/Hippen, Reinhard: Metzler Kabarett Lexikon, Vlg. J.B. Metzler, Stuttgart-Weimar 1996, 
 Deißner-Jenssen, Frauke: Die zehnte Muse – Kabarettisten erzählen, Henschel Verlag, Berlin (DDR) 1982
 Finck, Werner: Spaßvogel - Vogelfrei, Berlin 1991, 
 Fink, Iris: Von Travnicek bis Hinterholz 8 : Kabarett in Österreich ab 1945, von A bis Zugabe, Verl. Styria, Graz; Wien; Köln, 2000, 
 Glodek, Tobias/Haberecht, Christian/Ungern-Sternberg, Christoph: Politisches Kabarett und Satire. Mit Beiträgen von Volker Kühn, Henning Venske, Peter Ensikat, Eckart v. Hirschhausen u.a., Wissenschaftlicher Verlag Berlin, Berlin 2007. 
 Greul, Heinz: Bretter, die die Zeit bedeuten – Die Kulturgeschichte des Kabaretts, Kiepenheuer & Witsch, Köln-Berlin 1967
 Henningsen, Jürgen: Theorie des Kabaretts, Düsseldorf-Benrath 1967
 Hippen, Reinhard: Es liegt in der Luft. Kabarett im Dritten Reich, Zürich 1988
 Jacobs, Dietmar: Untersuchungen zum DDR-Berufskabarett der Ära Honecker, Frankfurt/M., Berlin, Bern, New York, Paris, Wien, 1996. 309 S. Kölner Studien zur Literaturwissenschaft Vol. 8, Edited by Neuhaus Volker, 
 Kühn, Volker: Deutschlands Erwachen. Kabarett unterm Hakenkreuz 1933-1945 (= Kleinkunststücke. Eine Kabarett-Bibliothek in fünf Bänden, Hrsg. Volker Kühn, Band3), Berlin 1989, S. 20.
 Otto, Rainer/Rösler, Walter: Kabarettgeschichte, Henschelverlag, Berlin (DDR) 1977
 Doris Rosenstein: Fernseh(schwäbisches) Kabarett [: Mathias Richling]. In: Suevica 7 (1993). Stuttgart 1994 [1995], S. 153-192 
 Siegordner, Martin: Politisches Kabarett- Definition, Geschichte und Stellung. GRIN Verlag, 2004. 
 Schumann, Werner: Unsterbliches Kabarett, Richard Beeck Vlg., Hannover 1948
 Vogel, Benedikt: Fiktionskulisse – Poetik und Geschichte des Kabaretts, Mentis Vlg., Paderborn 1993, 
 Wacks, Georg: Die Budapester Orpheumgesellschaft. Ein Varieté in Wien 1889-1919. Vorwort: Gerhard Bronner, Holzhausen Verlag, Wien 2002, 
 Zivier, Georg/Kotschenreuter, Hellmut/Ludwig, Volker: Kabarett mit K – Siebzig Jahre große Kleinkunst, Berlin Verlag Arno Spitz, Berlin 1989, 

Cabaret
 
German-speaking people by occupation
German humour
Austrian humour
Culture in Vienna
German political satire
Weimar cabaret